Ploeren is a commune in the Morbihan department of the region of Brittany in north-western France.

Geography
It is situated on the main express road RN165 from Nantes to Brest, adjoining the city of Vannes by the west.

Ploeren's territory is 20.44 km2, and there were 6,284 inhabitants in 2013.

Map

Population

The population has grown very quickly over the past 50 years.

Monuments
There are a few monuments, like the Saint-Martin church, and, more surprisingly, a replica of the Statue of Liberty, visible from the main road.

There is also the Triskell, a cultural center with a library, a theater and a lot of space to organize events at the heart of the village.

To organize bigger events, one can find the multipurpose hall named the Spi, surrounded by 2 football fields, tennis courts and another hall.

Education
There are 2 primary schools: Georges-Brassens, a public school, and Ker Anna, a private school.

In 2013, 54 primary school students learned Breton (roughly 10% of primary school students).

Administration
The former mayor, Corentin Hilly, invented a new type of traffic lane named “Voie 2M”, which consists in two separate lanes; the first one is a normal road for engine vehicles, and the second one is for all ways of moving without an engine, like riding a bicycle or walking.

The current mayor is Gilbert Lorho who was elected in 2014.

Twin towns
Ploeren is paired with: Samtgemeinde Land Wursten (Germany)

People
Ploeren was the birthplace of:
 Mathieu Berson (born 1980), footballer

See also
 Communes of the Morbihan department
 Veneti (Gaul)

References

External links

Official website 

 Mayors of Morbihan Association 

Communes of Morbihan